Mönhhairhan Mountain ("Holy eternal mountain") is the second highest mountain in Mongolia, located in the Bayan-Ölgii Province.

See also 
 List of mountains in Mongolia
 List of Ultras of Central Asia
 List of Altai mountains

References

External links 
 "Munkh Khairkhan, Mongolia" on Peakbagger
 AsiaTravelMONGOLIA asiatravelmongolia

Mountains of Mongolia
Altai Mountains
Khovd Province